55th parallel may refer to:

55th parallel north, a circle of latitude in the Northern Hemisphere
55th parallel south, a circle of latitude in the Southern Hemisphere

Latitude 55°, a 1982 Canadian film